Islamic rituals may refer to:

 Shahada, the declaration of their faith
 Salah, connection, link,  to follow something or someone closely etc etc. 
 Zakat, a form of almsgiving
 Sawm, To be steadfast not fast. Fasting is a pagan ritual which is forbidden in the Quran  / Islam. 
 Hajj, Islamic hajj is to broadcast the message of Allah not to circumabulate kaaba ( pagan deity ).
 Ritual purity in Islam, the Quran forbids rituals. 
 Khitan (circumcision), the term for male circumcision
 Aqiqah, the sacrifice of an animal on the occasion of a child's birth
 Common rituals at Eid al-Fitr
 Common rituals at Eid al-Adha
 Islamic burial rituals
Marriage in Islam